The Handicraft Guild Building is located at 89 10th Street South, Minneapolis, Minnesota, United States. It was designed in 1907 by architect William Channing Whitney in the Georgian Revival/Arts & Crafts style to house The Handicraft Guild. An addition to the Handicraft Guild was designed in 1914 by architects Edwin Hawley Hewitt and Edwin Brown at 1000-1006 Marquette Avenue South Minneapolis, Minnesota.

It was protected in 1998 by the Minneapolis Heritage Preservation Commission despite attempts by condominium developers to tear the building down. The building houses The Handicraft Guild; founded in 1904, an artist collective and gallery space, and prominent in the Arts in Minneapolis scene.

Early 1900s Arts and Crafts movement tile work can be found in suites throughout the building.

External links
 The Handicraft Guild Building - Minneapolis Heritage Preservation Commission
 Handicraft Guild on Placeography.org
 Slideshow - What does it look like?
 Handicraft Guild Addition on Placeography.org
 Slideshow -What does it look like?
   Handicraft Guild Art Collective 2015
 Development proposal 2015 

Buildings and structures in Minneapolis